Thomas Nolan (27 July 1921 – 17 August 1992) was an Irish Fianna Fáil politician who served as Minister for Labour from 1980 to 1981 and Minister of State at the Department of Health and Social Welfare from 1979 to 1980. He served as a Teachta Dála (TD) for the Carlow–Kilkenny constituency from 1965 to 1982.

Life and work
Nolan was born in Myshall, County Carlow in 1921. He was educated at the De La Salle College in Muine Bheag, County Carlow, and joined the Irish Defence Forces shortly after his education. He first held political office in 1960, when he was elected to Carlow County Council. The following year he was nominated by the Taoiseach, Seán Lemass, to the 10th Seanad.

Nolan was first elected to Dáil Éireann as a Fianna Fáil TD for the Carlow–Kilkenny constituency at the 1965 general election. He was re-elected at a further four general elections, but was defeated at the February 1982 general election, and did not stand again. Nolan had also served as an MEP in the period when MEPs were appointed by national parliaments rather than directly elected, serving from 1973 until the first direct elections in 1979.

Nolan was appointed as Minister of State at the Department of Health and Minister of State at the Department of Social Welfare in early 1980 on the nomination of Charles Haughey, and briefly entered the cabinet toward the end of his career, serving under Haughey as Minister for Labour from December 1980 to June 1981.

His son M. J. Nolan is a former Fianna Fáil TD and senator.

See also
Families in the Oireachtas

References

1921 births
1992 deaths
Fianna Fáil TDs
Members of the 10th Seanad
Members of the 18th Dáil
Members of the 19th Dáil
Members of the 20th Dáil
Members of the 21st Dáil
Members of the 22nd Dáil
Local councillors in County Carlow
Fianna Fáil MEPs
MEPs for the Republic of Ireland 1977–1979
MEPs for the Republic of Ireland 1973–1977
MEPs for the Republic of Ireland 1973
Politicians from County Carlow
Ministers of State of the 21st Dáil
Nominated members of Seanad Éireann
Fianna Fáil senators